The House by the Stable is a 1959 Australian TV play. It was a nativity play for Christmas and was filmed in Melbourne.

Cast
Brian James as Man
Sydney Conabere
Patricia Kennedy
Beverley Dunn

References

Australian drama television films
Australian television plays
1959 television films
1959 films
1959 drama films